Rahmatullah Khairkhah (born 21 February 1996) is an Afghan footballer who plays as a midfielder for Afghan club Toofan Harirod and the Afghanistan national team.

International career
Khairkhah made his debut for Afghanistan on 10 October 2019, in a 2022 FIFA World Cup qualifier match against Oman; he came on as an 80th-minute substitute in a 3–0 defeat.

References

External links
 
 

1996 births
Living people
Association football midfielders
Afghan footballers
Sportspeople from Herat
Afghan Premier League players
Toofan Harirod F.C. players
Afghanistan international footballers